This is a list of the main career statistics of former Czechoslovak-born American tennis player Martina Navratilova.

Significant finals

Grand Slam finals

Singles: 32 (18–14)
By winning the 1983 US Open title, Navratilova completed the Career Grand Slam. She became only the seventh female player in history to achieve this.

Doubles: 37 (31–6)
By winning the 1980 Australian Open title, Navratilova completed the women's doubles Career Grand Slam. She became the ninth female player in history to achieve this.

Mixed doubles: 16 (10–6)
By winning the 2003 Australian Open title, Navratilova completed the mixed doubles Career Grand Slam. She became only the third female player in history to achieve this. Having also completed Career Grand Slams in singles and doubles, Navratilova completed the "Career Boxed Set", only the second player in the Open Era after Margaret Court to do so.

Year-End Championships finals

Singles: 14 (8–6)

Doubles: 11 (11–0)

Singles performance timelines

Grand Slam tournaments

Note: Australian Open was held twice in 1977, in January and December, and was not held in 1986.

 * World Rank before the 1975 inception of WTA rankings.

See also
 Performance timelines for all female tennis players who reached at least one Grand Slam final

Other tournaments

Career singles statistics

 Navratilova did not play an official WTA tour singles match from 1995 through 2001.

Doubles performance timeline

Grand Slam doubles

Grand Slam mixed doubles

Note: The Australian Open was held twice in 1977, in January and December, and was not held in 1986.

WTA singles finals

Titles: (167)

Runner-ups: (72)

Doubles finals

Doubles: 223 (177 wins, 46 losses)

Grand Slam Mixed doubles: 16

Non-Grand Slam mixed doubles: 5

WTA Tour career earnings

Record against top 10 players
Navratilova's record against players who have been ranked in the top 10:

See also
 Evert–Navratilova rivalry
 Graf–Navratilova rivalry

References

Statistics
Tennis career statistics